Pâté is a paste, pie or loaf filled with a forcemeat. Common forcemeats include ground meat from pork, poultry, fish or beef; fat, vegetables, herbs, spices and either wine or brandy (often cognac or armagnac). It is often served on or with bread or crackers.

Pâté can be served either hot or cold, but it is considered to develop its best flavors after a few days of chilling.

History 
Pâté is believed to have originated in medieval France. The word pâté derives from the Old French word patete, which referred to any sort of paste. It was used to refer to the filling of any sort of pastry. Pâté is believed to have developed as a means of preserving the meat of game that could not be kept fresh. In the 16th century, it became popular with French royalty, and in the 17th century, the first recorded pâtés appeared. The first pâtés were made from a mixture of beef and chicken with various spices. By the 19th century, pâté was a staple in French cuisine.

Variations 
In French or Belgian cuisine, pâté may be baked in a crust as pie or loaf, in which case it is called pâté en croûte, or baked in a terrine (or other mold), in which case it is known as pâté en terrine. Traditionally, a forcemeat mixture cooked and served in a terrine is also called a terrine. The most famous pâté is probably pâté de foie gras, made from the livers of fattened geese. 

Pâté en croûte is baked with the insertion of "chimneys" on top: small tubes or funnels that allow steam to escape, thus keeping the pastry crust from turning damp or soggy. Baked pâté en croûte usually develops an air bubble under the crust top as the meat mixture shrinks during baking; this is traditionally dealt with by infusing semi-liquid aspic in the hollow space before chilling. 

In Poland, pasztet is made from poultry, fish, venison, ham, or pork with eggs, flour, bread crumbs, and a varied range of additions, such as pepper, tomato sauce, mushrooms, spices, vegetables, ginger, nutmeg, cheese, or sugar.

In Russia, the dish is mostly prepared with beef, goose or chicken liver and thus is commonly known as pechyonochniy pashtet ("liver pâté"); however, other meats also can be used. Unlike the Western European method, the liver is first cooked (boiled or fried) and mixed with butter or fat and seasoning such as fresh or fried onion, carrots, spices and herbs. It can be further cooked (usually baked), but most often is used without any other preparation. In Russia, the pâté is served on a plate or in a bowl, and is often molded into the shapes of animals, such as hedgehogs. 

A similar recipe is known as chopped liver in Ashkenazi Jewish cuisine, with schmaltz used instead of butter and hard-boiled eggs usually added. Another common type of pâté in Jewish cuisine, also popular in Russia and Ukraine, is vorschmack or gehakte herring (chopped herring).

In the former Yugoslavia, pašteta or паштета (a thinly pureed pâté) is a popular bread spread usually made from liver, chicken, pork, ham, beef, turkey or less commonly tuna, trout or salmon.

In Vietnamese cuisine, pâté is commonly used on bánh mì baguette-type sandwiches. Pâté of this type is more commonly made from liver.

Liver sausage

In much of northern and central Europe, there are soft, spreadable sausages made primarily with liver and sometimes confused with pâté.

See also 

 Cretons
 Fatback
 Galantine
 Gefilte fish
 Head cheese
 Offal
 Rillettes
 Leverpostej
 Liver spread
 List of spreads
 Livermush

References

External links 
 

Appetizers
Belgian cuisine
Charcuterie
Food paste
French cuisine
Garde manger
Liver (food)
Offal
Spreads (food)
Vietnamese cuisine
Ground meat